Darlington GO Station is a planned GO Transit train station to be built by Metrolinx in the community of Darlington, Ontario, Canada, as part of the approved expansion of train service on the Lakeshore East line to Bowmanville. It will be situated between the main downtown areas of Oshawa and Bowmanville, in an area that is anticipated to be developed over the next few years. The station is intended to serve areas east of the station, as there will be close access to Highway 401. Approximately 1,100 parking spaces will be supplied on opening day, and future parking expansions will be possible. A bus loop and a "Kiss and Ride" area will be included. Initially, it will consist of one side platform, which will become an island platform as demand grows and a second track is built. In 2017, the station was expected to open in 2024.

, Metrolinx identifies this station by the name "Courtice" rather than "Darlington" on its website; the station name is still subject to change.

References

External links
 GO Transit - Environmental Assessments

Future GO Transit railway stations
Railway stations in the Regional Municipality of Durham
Transport in Clarington
Proposed railway stations in Canada